Vas Coleman (born May 25, 1999), known professionally as Yung Bans, is an American rapper and songwriter. He is best known for his singles including "Ridin'", "Lonely", "Dresser", "Right Through You", and "4TSpoon" featuring Playboi Carti; as well as the Yung Bans Vol. 1-5 mixtape series.

Early life
Vas Coleman was born in St. Louis, Missouri, Coleman moved to Atlanta, Georgia in the seventh grade. He attended Langston Hughes High School, as well as Virgil I. Grissom High School in Huntsville, AL. He is influenced by Lil Wayne.

Career 
Coleman began rapping in sixth grade under the moniker Ban Boy, but decided to make a career out of it in high school after first aspiring to play basketball. His first single was with fellow rapper Playboi Carti, titled "4Tspoon", released on May 21, 2015. Later that year in November, he and Ski Mask the Slump God featured on late rapper XXXTentacion's single "ILOVEITWHENTHEYRUN". In 2016, Coleman featured on Smokepurrp's single "Damage". The single was released on November 23, 2016. On December 22, 2016, Coleman released his second single "Right Through You".

Coleman started getting more recognition when he released his first two extended plays, the eponymous Yung Bans and Yung Bans Vol. 2 in December 2017.

Coleman also released the song "Ridin" featuring YBN Nahmir and Landon Cube in late June 2018.

In 2018, Coleman also released three other installations in the series, including Yung Bans Vol. 3, Yung Bans Vol. 4, and Yung Bans Vol. 5.
In November of that year, he collaborated with fellow rapper Jasiah on the track 'Shenanigans', produced by Jasiah and Ronny J.

In July 2019, Coleman released his debut studio album titled Misunderstood.

Discography

Studio albums 
 Misunderstood (2019)

Mixtapes 

 Yung Bans (2017)
 Yung Bans Vol. 2 (2017)
 Yung Bans Vol. 3 (2018)
 Yung Bans Vol. 4 (2018)
 Yung Bans Vol. 5 (2018)

References 

Living people
1999 births
African-American male rappers
Rappers from Atlanta
Mumble rappers
21st-century American rappers
21st-century American male musicians
21st-century African-American musicians